Rudkhaneh (also Romanized as Rūdkhāneh; also known as Pūl and Rūdkhāneh Pol) is a village in Gevar Rural District, Sarduiyeh District, Jiroft County, Kerman Province, Iran. At the 2006 census, its population was 26, in 7 families.

References 

Populated places in Jiroft County